The Flat is a 1921 British silent drama film directed by Fred Paul and starring Jack Raymond and George Foley. Its plot involves a man who is invited back to a flat for a drink by a stranger he meets in a pub. It was part of a Grand Guignol series of films.

Cast
 Jack Raymond - John Timkins  
  George Foley - The Stranger

References

External links

1921 films
British silent short films
1921 drama films
Films directed by Fred Paul
British drama films
British black-and-white films
1920s English-language films
1920s British films
Silent drama films